Almir Aganović is a Bosnian volleyball player at the highest national level.

Almir Aganović has played for most of his career with OK Kakanj, Bosnia's most successful professional volleyball club.  With OK Kakanj he won the Premier League of Volleyball of Bosnia and Herzegovina 7 times, and National Cup of Bosnia and Herzegovina 10 times.  He was captain of the OK Kakanj team which won the 2009-2010 national championship.
In 2011 he captained OK Kakanj in the club's 13th National Cup success.  He has also won the Premier League of Volleyball of Bosnia and Herzegovina championship once with OK Napredak Odzak.

He plays as a spiker.

References

Living people
1973 births
Bosnia and Herzegovina men's volleyball players